In mathematics, the class of Muckenhoupt weights  consists of those weights  for which the Hardy–Littlewood maximal operator is bounded on .

Let , we wish to characterise the functions  for which we have a bound

This was first done by Benjamin Muckenhoupt.

Definition

We say  belongs to  if there exists some  such that

 

for all  and all balls .

Equivalent characterizations
This following result is a fundamental result in the study of Muckenhoupt weights.

Theorem. A weight  is in  if and only if any one of the following hold.

where:

Equivalently:

Theorem. Let , then  if and only if both of the following hold:

This equivalence can be verified by using Jensen's Inequality.

Reverse Hölder inequalities and 
The main tool in the proof of the above equivalence is the following result. The following statements are equivalent

There exist  such that for all balls  and subsets ,  implies .
 

We call the inequality in the third formulation a reverse Hölder inequality as the reverse inequality follows for any non-negative function directly from Hölder's inequality.

Weights and BMO
The definition of an  weight and the reverse Hölder inequality indicate that such a weight cannot degenerate or grow too quickly. This property can be phrased equivalently in terms of how much the logarithm of the weight oscillates:

(a) If  then  (i.e.  has bounded mean oscillation).

This equivalence can be established by using the exponential characterization of weights above, Jensen's inequality, and the John–Nirenberg inequality.

is not in any .

Further properties
Here we list a few miscellaneous properties about weights, some of which can be verified from using the definitions, others are nontrivial results:

If , then there is  such that .

Boundedness of singular integrals
It is not only the Hardy–Littlewood maximal operator that is bounded on these weighted  spaces. In fact, any Calderón-Zygmund singular integral operator is also bounded on these spaces. Let us describe a simpler version of this here.

 

Suppose also that we can realise  as convolution against a kernel  in the following sense: if  are smooth with disjoint support, then:

 

Finally we assume a size and smoothness condition on the kernel :

 

That is, we have the estimate

 

for all  for which the right-hand side is finite.

A converse result
If, in addition to the three conditions above, we assume the non-degeneracy condition on the kernel : For a fixed unit vector 

 

If we know

 

Weights and quasiconformal mappings
For , a -quasiconformal mapping is a homeomorphism  such that

Harmonic measure
(Note that in this case, one needs to adapt the definition of weights to the case where the underlying measure is one-dimensional Hausdorff measure).

References
 

Real analysis
Harmonic analysis
Lp spaces